Buried Alive is a talk show broadcast on RTÉ One in Ireland. It is hosted by the Irish comedian Dara Ó Briain. Each week a celebrity from Irish society is invited onto the show to view their own "obituary film". The show highlights the careers of different celebrities and sees their reactions to different parts of their lives.

Past guests include: 

Barry McGuigan 
Mary Coughlan
Dave Fanning  
Ray Houghton
David Norris  
Eddie O'Sullivan
Frank Kelly 
Eileen Reid
Mary Peters   
Louis Walsh

See also
 List of programmes broadcast by RTÉ

Irish television talk shows
RTÉ original programming